Mehbube Ablesh (born 1979) is a Uyghur radio presenter, journalist, poet and political prisoner. She was arrested in 2008 and her whereabouts were still unknown in 2015.

Biography 
Ablesh was born in 1979. In August 2008 she was dismissed from her role in the advertising department of Xinjiang People's Radio Station, which is based in Ürümqi. After her dismissal she was arrested by police on charges relating to her blogging and her criticism of the authorities. This reportedly including criticism of the 2008 Beijing Summer Olympics and well as the Chinese government's response to the effects of the Sichuan earthquake in 2008 on Uyghur communities. Criticism levelled at Ablesh after she was imprisoned included the fact that she was a Muslim woman, but did not wear a headscarf. She was detained at Xinjiang Number 2 Prison. Her detention by Chinese authorities violated Article 19 of the International Covenant on Civil and Political Rights.

Ablesh, also known in some Chinese government reports as Mehbube Abrek, was due to be released from prison in 2011. In 2015 her whereabouts were unknown.

See also
List of people who disappeared

References 

1979 births
2010s missing person cases
21st-century journalists
21st-century poets
Missing person cases in Asia
Uyghur women poets
Women radio journalists
Women radio presenters
Possibly living people
Enforced disappearances in China